Watthana or Vadhana is one of the 50 districts (khet) of Bangkok, Thailand. Neighbouring districts are (from the north clockwise): Ratchathewi, Huai Khwang, Suan Luang, Phra Khanong, Khlong Toei, and Pathum Wan.

History

Watthana became a separate district by splitting from Khlong Toei in 1998 to provide better service to its population. The district obtained its name from Princess Galyani Vadhana, the elder sister of King Bhumibol Adulyadej. Watthana or Vadhana means 'development'. The area is among the most developed parts of Bangkok.

On 1 January 2009, Watthana was the location of the Santika Club fire, which killed 66 and injured 222.

Administration
The district is divided into three sub-districts (khwaeng), from west to east: 

They are all named by adding Nuea, meaning North, to the corresponding subdistricts in Khlong Toei district.

Places
Encompassing the area between Sukhumvit Road and Khlong Saen Saep, Watthana is one of the commercial districts in Bangkok, with many condominiums and hotels. Expatriates of many nationalities reside there.

Shopping

 Sukhumvit Road - Vendors selling counterfeit DVDs, T-shirts and tourist trinkets clog the sidewalks from Soi 3 to Soi 15.
 Foodland - One of the branches of the Thai grocery chain is located on Soi 5. It also has a 24-hour coffee shop.
 Terminal 21 is a mixed-use complex near Sukhumvit Road 21, near the Asok intersection. It opened in October 2011 and is now one of the major shopping centers. 
 EmQuartier - a shopping center opened in 2015. It is opposite of Emporium (which is in Khlong Toei district) and is operated by the same owner, The Mall Group.
 Villa Plaza - Between the Sukhumvit 33 nightlife area and Soi 31, the plaza is a shopping and entertainment area anchored by the Villa (open 24 hours) and Fuji supermarkets. It also has some Japanese-only clubs, as well as British-style pubs.
 Thong Lo - This street has become trendy in recent years, with a number of upscale restaurants and "boutique" shopping centres.
 Major Sukhumvit - A large branch of the Major Cineplex cinema chain near Ekkamai BTS Station, with a bowling alley, restaurants and shops.

Dining and entertainment
 "Little Africa" - Near the Grace Hotel, there's a network of alleys between Nana Nuea or Sukhumvit Soi 3 and Soi 5 that is home to many Middle Eastern restaurants.
 Soi Cowboy - Nightlife strip with go-go bars is off Asok, near the intersection with Sukhumvit.

Hospitals
 Bumrungrad International Hospital - Major medical center that caters to tourists on Soi Sukhumvit 3.
 Samitivej Hospital - An up-scale hospital, on Soi Sukhumvit 49.
 Camillian Hospital - A small Catholic hospital on Thong Lo.
 Sukhumvit Hospital - Near the Bangkok Skytrain Ekkamai station.

Transportation

Roads

Besides the eastbound Sukhumvit, prominent roads in the district include several odd-numbered sois (branch roads) from Sukhumvit: Nana Nuea (Sukhumvit 3), Asok Montri (Sukhumvit 21), Phrom Phong (Sukhumvit 39), Thong Lo (Sukhumvit 55), Ekkamai (Sukhumvit 63), Sukhumvit 71 (Pridi Banomyong) and a small portion of On Nut (Sukhumvit 77).

Public transportation
 BTS Skytrain - Stations in the district are Nana, Asok, Phrom Phong, Ekkamai, and Phra Khanong on the Sukhumvit Line
 MRT - Sukhumvit Station on the Blue Line
 Khlong Saen Saep boat service - Borders the district; piers for the express boat service are Nana Nuea, Nana Chat, Asok, Prasan Mit, Ital-Thai, Wat Mai Chong Lom, Thong Lo, Chan Issara, and Khlong Tan.

Symbols
The emblem of the district shows a pavilion, which refers to the residence of Princess Galyani Vadhana, the name patron of the district. Also the red colour refers to the princess, as red is the day colour of her birthday. The golden rays of light extending from the roof of the pavilion are said to symbolise her divine grace to all Thais. The lotus shape is supposed to be an offering to pay respect to the princess.

Education

Several international schools are in Watthana District, including The American School of Bangkok's Sukhumvit campus; Anglo Singapore International School's Anglo campus; Ekamai International School; NIST International School; and Wells International Kindergarten's Thong Lor campus.

Higher education
 Srinakharinwirot University - Prasarnmit Campus is on Sukhumvit 23.
 Siam Society - Established in 1904, it offers lectures, exhibits and trips for Thai and foreign residents who are interested in the study of artistic, scientific and cultural affairs of Thailand. On Asok, near Sukhumvit MRT Station.
 Japan Foundation - On the 10th Floor of Sermmit Tower on Asok Montri Road, the foundation has a library, art exhibits, lectures and film screenings, primarily designed to teach Japanese culture to Thais.
 Accademia Italiana Thailand

Diplomatic missions
 Embassy of Argentina
 Embassy of Bangladesh
 Embassy of Brunei
 Embassy of Egypt
 Embassy of India
 Embassy of Iran
 Embassy of Israel
 Embassy of Kenya
 Embassy of Mongolia
 Embassy of Nepal
 Embassy of Nigeria
 Embassy of Norway
 Embassy of Pakistan
 Embassy of Peru
 Embassy of Sri Lanka

References

External links

 BMA website with the tourist landmarks of Watthana
 Watthana district office (Thai only)
 Official map

 
Districts of Bangkok